
Write Ahead Physical Block Logging (WAPBL) provides meta data journaling for file systems in conjunction with Fast File System (FFS) to accomplish rapid filesystem consistency after an unclean shutdown of the filesystem and better general use performance over regular FFS.  With the journal, fsck is no longer required at system boot; instead, the system can replay the journal in order to correct any inconsistencies in the filesystem if the system has been shut down in an unclean fashion.

History 

WAPBL was initially committed into NetBSD in 2008, and first appeared with NetBSD 5.0 (2009).

With NetBSD 6.0 (2012), soft updates (known as soft dependencies in NetBSD) was removed in favour of WAPBL.

See also 

 Log-structured file system
 Soft updates
 Unix File System (UFS/FFS)

References

External links 

 
 
 

Computer file systems
Disk file systems
NetBSD
Unix file system technology